The Vanuatu national beach soccer team represents Vanuatu in international beach soccer competitions and is controlled by the Vanuatu Football Federation, the governing body for football in Vanuatu.

Current squad
The following players were called to the squad for the 2019 OFC Beach Soccer Nations Cup from 17–22 June 2019.Caps and goals updated as of 1 June 2019 before the game against Tahiti.

Achievements
 FIFA Beach Soccer World Cup qualification (OFC) Best: Runners-up
 2006, 2007, 2009

External links
 Squad
 Training squad

Oceanian national beach soccer teams
Beach Soccer